Fereydoun Asgharzadeh was an Iranian football coach who managed the national team at the 1986 Fajr International Tournament.

References

Date of birth missing
Possibly living people
Iranian football managers
Iran national football team managers